The 1920 Down County Council election was held on Tuesday 25 May 1920.

Results by electoral division

Downpatrick

Dromore

Newtownards

Newry

Notes 

 1. Newtownards electoral area results were declared Friday 28 May 1920. Only J.M. Andrews was elected on the first count.
 2. A member of the Dickson family had held the seat on the county council since its formation in 1899.

References 

1920 Irish local elections
1920